Corongoceras is a genus of ammonites in the family Himalayitidae.

See also 
 List of ammonite genera

References

External links 

 
 

Ammonitida genera
Perisphinctoidea